Amajur al-Turki (also known as Majur, Anajur and Majura) was a Turkic military officer for the Abbasid Caliphate. He served as the governor of Damascus during the caliphate of al-Mu'tamid, from 870 until his death in ca. 878.

Career

 
Little is known about Amajur outside of his governorship of Damascus; it is possible that he was related to the later Banu Amajur family of astronomers, but this is not known for certain. He received his appointment around the time of al-Mu'tamid's accession and was dispatched to Syria with a contingent of several hundred Turkish soldiers. He initially had difficulty establishing his authority within the province, due to the presence of the rebel 'Isa ibn al-Shaykh, and was forced to fight the latter in the vicinity of Damascus. Despite having a much smaller force, Amajur won the engagement, routing 'Isa's army and killing his son Mansur. Shortly after the battle, 'Isa abandoned Syria for Armenia, thereby securing Amajur's position as governor.

Over the course of the next several years, Amajur administered the province with a firm hand. He maintained a state of order, making the roads secure and cracking down against bandits, and also engaged in the building of public works. At the same time, however, an oppressive tax regime was instituted during his governorship, and a period of major inflation resulted in a general increase in poverty. In ca. 876 he presented a Qur'an to a mosque in Tyre, granting it as a waqf; several folios from this work still exist.

In ca. 877 the Abbasid regent al-Muwaffaq decided to appoint Amajur over Egypt, as its governor Ahmad ibn Tulun had been displaying signs of independence. Although Amajur was somewhat reluctant about the plan, the general Musa ibn Bugha was dispatched to enforce the decision and install him in the province. The expedition, however, stalled at Raqqa and came to an end when Musa's troops revolted against him, forcing him to return to Iraq; as a result, Ibn Tulun remained in control of Egypt.

Amajur died in ca. 878. He was briefly succeeded as governor by his minor son 'Ali; that same year, however, Ibn Tulun decided to take advantage of his death and marched into Syria, adding the province to his domains.

Notes

References
 Abu al-Fath, Ibn Abi al-Hasan al-Samiri al-Danafi. Continuation of the Samaritan chronicle of Abu L-Fath Al-Samiri Al-Danafi. Ed. and trans. Milka Levy-Rubin. Princeton, NJ: Darwin Press, 2002. 
 Cobb, Paul M. White Banners: Contention in 'Abbasid Syria, 750-880. Albany, NY: State University of New York Press, 2001. 
 Ettinghausen, Richard, Oleg Grabar and Marilyn Jenkins-Madina. Islamic Art and Architecture 650-1250. New Haven: Yale University Press, 2001. 
 
 
 Ibn 'Asakir, Abu al-Qasim 'Ali ibn al-Hasan ibn Hibat Allah. Tarikh Madinat Dimashq, Vol 9. Ed. 'Umar ibn Gharama al-'Amrawi. Beirut: Dar al-Fikr, 1995.
 Ibn al-Athir, 'Izz al-Din. Al-Kamil fi al-Tarikh, Vol. 6. Beirut: Dar al-‘Ilmiyyah, 1987.
 "Islamic Manuscripts: al-Qur'an." Cambridge Digital Library. Retrieved 30 December 2013.
 Al-Kindi, Muhammad ibn Yusuf. The Governors and Judges of Egypt. Ed. Rhuvon Guest. Leydon and London: E. J. Brill, 1912.
 Lewis, Bernard. "Egypt and Syria." The Cambridge History of Islam, Volume 1A. Ed. P.M. Holt, Ann K.S. Lambton and Bernard Lewis. Cambridge, UK: Cambridge University Press, 1970. 
 Al-Mas'udi, Ali ibn al-Husain. Les Prairies D'Or. Ed. and Trans. Charles Barbier de Meynard and Abel Pavet de Courteille. 9 vols. Paris: Imprimerie Nationale, 1861-1917.
 
 
 Al-Ya'qubi, Ahmad ibn Abu Ya'qub. Historiae, Vol. 2. Ed. M. Th. Houtsma. Leiden: E. J. Brill, 1883.

870s deaths
Abbasid governors of Damascus
Year of birth missing
9th-century people from the Abbasid Caliphate
9th-century Turkic people